A Love Supreme is the second album by American singer Chanté Moore, released on November 15, 1994, through Silas Records and MCA Records. The album features production from Simon Law, Moore, Ross Anderson, Jimmy Jam and Terry Lewis, Kenneth Crouch, Kipper Jones, Tricky Stewart, among others.

The album was preceded by the release of the singles "Old School Lovin'", "This Time", "Free/Sail On" and "I'm What You Need". The album peaked at number 64 on the US Billboard 200 and number 11 on the Top R&B/Hip-Hop Albums chart on December 3, 1994.

Background and release
The album gave Moore another US Top 20 R&B hit with the single "Old School Lovin'". The album also contains a remake of the Alicia Myers hit "I Want to Thank You," as well as a medley/mash-up of the Deniece Williams song "Free"  and the Commodores song "Sail On". Track 11, "Mood", also appears on the soundtrack to the Eddie Murphy film Beverly Hills Cop III. She was highly influenced by Tramaine Hawkins, Andrae Crouch and her mother who was a singer.

Critical reception

AllMusic expressed 'Chante is one of the leading new R&B divas.' Expanding further Allmusic writes, 'Chante Moore's supple, sensuous vocals snake around jazzy, R&B mid-tempo grooves, in search of the perfect love. From the sultry, spoken opening where she unmistakably states her modern-day intentions to the old phono recording scratches of "Old School Love," Chante searches, preys, teases, romances, and snares.' AllMusic praised Moore's vocal performances, writing 'her voice has a remarkable range, and an emotive quality rare in many new artists' and that it is ' reminiscent of Diana Ross, but a full-throttle Ross', whilst 'her jazz inclinations and rich, lower register also remind the listener of Anita Baker and Toni Braxton'. AllMusic also praised Moore's 'restraint', writing 'in "I'm What You Need" she reaches those glass-shattering Mariah Carey notes, but only a few, just enough to embellish the song'. In concluding, Allmusic writes 'Chante Moore is poised to become The Voice—so, make way for the next R&B diva'. Sherrie Winston of the Sun Sentinel wrote "Throughout A Love Supreme, Moore combines sultry vocals with lyrics of chivalry, romance and spirituality. The singer's range is phenomenal; her style undeniable." Winston added "A Love Supreme is a mellow listen that layers gritty island sounds with singing violins and harps. If the rap infusion has got you down, Moore offers a mellow, sexy and talented reprieve. Nothing against rap, of course, but A Love Supreme delivers its message with subtlety. The way it used to be." Similarly, People heralded Moore as 'something new: a twenty-something R & B singer who isn’t striving to be with the down crowd', writing that A Love Supreme is 'a welcome respite from R & B’s long queue of follow-the-leader divas'. Furthermore, People described A Love Supreme as 'a classic soul affair', comparing 'Moore’s supple, relaxed singing style' to a 'a young Diana Ross with more lung power'. Further praising Moore's vocal performance, People wrote, 'she builds up a romantic sweat while keeping her vocal cool on “My Special Perfect One” and “Mood,” and wrings tears without becoming maudlin on “Am I Losing You.”

Track listing

Personnel

Mark Abetz - engineer
Judi Acosta-Stewart - production coordination
Scott Alspach - producer
Michael Alvord	- assistant engineer
Ross Anderson - bass, drum programming, guitar, mixing, producer
Philip Bailey - guest artist, vocals (background)
Tom Baker - assistant engineer
Gary Barnacle - flute
Harvey Brough - string arrangements
Alexandra Brown - vocals (background)
Bridgette Bryant - vocals (Background)
James "Chip" Bunton - production coordination
David Campbell - string arrangements
Bryan Carrigan - second engineer
Teddy Castellucci - guitar
Richard Cottrell - engineer
Kenneth Crouch - multi instruments, producer
Paulinho da Costa - percussion
Kevin "KD" Davis - engineer, mixing
Sean Davis - assistant engineer
C.J. DeVillar - assistant engineer
George Duke - guest artist
Derrick Edmondson - saxophone
Danny Flynn - stylist
Gwyn Foxx - vocals (background)
Jud J. Friedman - keyboards, producer, string arrangements
Siedah Garrett - guest artist, vocals (background)
Sean "Sep" Hall - producer, programming, rhythm arrangements, sequencing, vocal arrangement
Lee Hamblin - drum programming, engineer, mixing, producer
Cynthia Harrell - vocals (background)
Kuk Harrell - engineer, producer, vocal arrangement
Steve Hodge - mixing
Jean-Marie Horvat - mixing
John Howcott - drum programming, keyboard programming, producer
Richard Huredia - mixing assistant
Phillip Ingram - vocals (background)
Booker T. Jones - mixing
Kipper Jones - guest artist, producer, vocals (background)
Pat Karamian - assistant engineer, second engineer
Brian Kilgore - percussion
Simon A. Law - bass, drum programming, keyboards, mixing, producer, string arrangements
Eugene Le - second engineer
Maxayn Lewis - vocals (background)
Jeff Madjef Taylor - Asst Engineer/Drum Programming
Eugene Lo - second engineer
Chris London - assistant engineer
Chanté Moore - executive producer, primary artist, producer, vocal arrangement, vocals, vocals (background)
Taavi Mote - engineer
Fred Moultrie - executive producer
Steve Musters- assistant engineer
Rick Nelson - vocals (background)
Michael Norfleet - multi instruments, producer
Emanuel Officer - producer, vocal arrangement
Steve Orchard - engineer
Sue Owens - production coordination
Donald Parks - drum programming, keyboard programming, producer
Greg Phillinganes - keyboards
Neil Pogue - engineer
Herb Powers - mastering
Adrian Reid - Fender Rhodes
Kevin Robinson - flugelhorn
Matthew Rolston - photography
Jeff Scantlebury - percussion
Louis Silas, Jr. - executive producer
Christopher "Tricky" Stewart - producer, programming, rhythm arrangements, sequencing, vocal arrangement
Laney Stewart - engineer, producer, programming, sequencing, vocal arrangement
Reggie Stewart - drum programming, keyboard programming
Lisa Taylor - vocals (background)
Francesca Tolot - make-up
Simon Wall - assistant engineer
Ilene Weingard - art direction, design
Warren Woods - engineer
Gavyn Wright - conductor
Jim "Z" Zumpano - engineer

Charts

Weekly charts

Year-end charts

References

External links

1994 albums
Chanté Moore albums
Silas Records albums
Albums produced by Simon Law
Albums produced by Jimmy Jam and Terry Lewis
Albums produced by Tricky Stewart
Albums produced by Laney Stewart
Albums produced by Kuk Harrell
Jazz albums by American artists